Dozdan (also Romanized as Dozdān; also known as Dozhdān) is a village in Javaran Rural District, Hanza District, Rabor County, Kerman Province, Iran. At the 2006 census, its population was 181, in 46 families.

References 

Populated places in Rabor County